Zlobayevo is a rural locality (a village) in Paustovskoye Rural Settlement, Vyaznikovsky District, Vladimir Oblast, Russia. The population was 51 as of 2010.

Geography 
Zlobayevo is located on the Indrus River, 39 km south of Vyazniki (the district's administrative centre) by road. Ananyino is the nearest rural locality.

References 

Rural localities in Vyaznikovsky District